Nikolaus Dumba (Greek: Νικόλαος Δούμπας; 24 July 1830, Vienna – 23 March 1900, Budapest) was an Austrian industrialist and liberal politician. He is considered to have been an important patron of the arts and music and a benefactor of Greece.

Biography 
In 1817, Nikolaus' father Stergios, an immigrant to Vienna from a family from Vlasti of Aromanian-Greek descent, then part of the Ottoman Empire and today a village in Northern Greece, became a merchant. Nikolaus attended the Akademische Gymnasium and spent the revolutionary years of 1847-48 with his brother Michael at the residence of the Austrian Ambassador Anton von Prokesch-Osten in Athens. In 1852, he took a trip to Egypt with the travel writer Alexander Ziegler.

He was trained for a commercial career and took over a cotton mill in Tattendorf that had been operated by his cousin Theodore. It had approximately 180 employees and soon became a highly profitable enterprise. This financial base allowed him to turn his interests elsewhere. He was knighted and appointed to the legislature, where he was very active.

His son, Konstantin, was Austria-Hungary's last Ambassador to the United States.

Patron 

He was a close friend of Hans Makart, Gustav Klimt and Carl Kundmann and was a strong promoter of contemporary art. He helped establish several monuments to famous composers of the past and served as a Vice-President of the Society of Friends of Music.

Dumba left 50,000 florins to the Vienna Men's Choral Society in order to free them from financial concerns. In return, he asked that "from time to time, a choral work in remembrance of me should be performed in a church" and that "the money should never be used for a building". To this day, Franz Schubert's German Mass is often sung in his honor.

In his will, he bequeathed over 200 original manuscripts by Schubert to the City of Vienna. These formed the basis for what is now the world's largest collection of musical scores at the Vienna Library

Benefactor in Greece 
During a visit to Athens with his wife Anna, he made a grant to the University of Athens to finish the building interiors. In the city of Serres, near his father's hometown, he founded an orphanage and contributed to the construction of a vocational school, under the aegis of his friend, Georgios Averoff.

Political functions 
From 1870 to 1896, he was a member of the Landtag, where he served on the Finance Committee and the Poor Law Committee, occasionally acting as the Landtag chairman's deputy. In 1885, the Kaiser appointed him to the Herrenhaus, the Upper Chamber of the Imperial Council of Austria.

Selected honors

Medals
 Order of the Iron Crown, Second Class
 Knight's Cross of the Order of Franz Joseph
 Commander's Cross, First Class, of the Romanian Order of the Crown

Places
 On 28, March, 1900, the "Künstlergasse" (Artist Alley) was renamed the "Dumbastraße", by vote of the Vienna City Council.

References

Further reading 
 
 Felix Czeike: Historisches Lexikon Wien. Verlag Kremayr & Scheriau, Wien 1993,  (volume 2) .
 Elvira Konecny: Die Familie Dumba und ihre Bedeutung für Wien und Österreich, .
 
 Herwig Würtz: Nicolaus Dumba, Portrait eines Mäzens. Die Schubert-Sammlung der Stadt Wien.

External links 
 TAR (Music Magazine): biography of Dumba
  (First news of his death)
  (Detailed report and obituary) Fortsetzung S. 5
 

1830 births
1900 deaths
Philanthropists from Vienna
Austrian people of Aromanian descent
Austrian people of Greek descent
Constitutional Party (Austria) politicians
Members of the Austrian House of Deputies (1870–1871)
Members of the Austrian House of Deputies (1871–1873)
Members of the Austrian House of Deputies (1873–1879)
Members of the Austrian House of Deputies (1879–1885)
Members of the House of Lords (Austria)
Austrian industrialists
Austrian art patrons
Austrian patrons of music
19th-century Austrian businesspeople
19th-century Australian philanthropists